Lee Chang-ho (born 4 May 1989) is a South Korean footballer who plays as midfielder for Hwaseong FC in K League Challenge.

Career

Club career
He was selected by Gyeongnam FC in 2010 K-League Draft.

International career
He was called to the U-20 team to participate in 2008 AFC U-19 Championship.

References

External links 

1989 births
Living people
Association football midfielders
South Korean footballers
Gyeongnam FC players
Korean Police FC (Semi-professional) players
Suwon FC players
Hwaseong FC players
K League 1 players
K League 2 players
Soongsil University alumni